The XM307 Advanced Crew Served Weapon (ACSW) was a developmental 25 mm belt-fed automatic grenade launcher with programmable airburst capability. It is the result of the OCSW or Objective Crew Served Weapon project. It is lightweight and designed to be two-man portable, as well as vehicle mounted. The XM307 can kill or suppress enemy combatants out to 2,000 meters (2,187 yd), and destroy lightly armored vehicles, watercraft, and helicopters at 1,000 meters (1,094 yd). The project was canceled in 2007.

Overview
The system was under development by General Dynamics Armament and Technical Products for the U.S. Army Tank-Automotive and Armaments Command (TACOM). As a part of the Small Arms Master Plan (SAMP) program, it is intended to either replace or supplement the Mk19 automatic grenade launcher and the M2 heavy machine gun.  It fires 25 mm point-detonating and air burst style ammunition, including HE, and HEAT at a cyclic rate of 260 rounds per minute and has an effective range up to 2 kilometers.

The primary feature of the XM307 is its attenuated recoil system.  The weapon controls recoil to a degree that a large tripod and heavy sandbags are not required to effectively employ this weapon.  Because of its reduced recoil impulse and light weight, other mounting options are  possible, such as small unmanned vehicles and aircraft. The XM307's airburst rounds make it much easier to bypass walls protecting enemies that could cause collateral damage if fired upon directly. Operators do not have to shoot through the wall, just through an opening or over the top to kill the people behind the cover, leaving the structure of the building intact. An additional feature of the XM307 is that it can be converted into the XM312, a 12.7 mm (.50)-caliber version for infantry and light anti-armor support in under two minutes (1 minute, 42 seconds).

Specifications
System
Weight: 50 lb (22.5 kg) (gun, mount, and fire control)
Fire Control: full solution, day/night
Portability: two-man portable and vehicle mountable
Stability: up to 18 inch (457 mm) tripod height
Environmental: operationally insensitive to conditions

Gun
Dimensions: 9.9 W × 7.2 H × 52.3 L max inches (43.3 L charged) / 251 mm × 183 mm × 1328 mm (1100 mm charged)
Rate of Fire: 250 rounds per minute, automatic
Dispersion: less than 1.5 mils, one sigma radius
Range: lethal and suppressive out to 2,000 m
Ammunition: high-explosive airbursting, armor-piercing, and training ammunition (HE, AP, TP, TP-S)
Feed System: weapon-mountable ammunition can (left feed)

Variants
A Remotely Operated Variant (ROV) for the Future Combat Systems family of vehicles is also under development.  The weapon system, which would be mounted on the vehicle, will be remotely operated from within the vehicle.

Program status
In May 2004, the development phase was funded through FY 2007.
In December 2005 funding was granted for a remotely operated vehicle variant.
However, in 2007 the project was canceled due to the low rate of fire of the prototypes.

See also
 LAG 40 grenade launcher, an automatic grenade launcher used by Spain
 Vektor Y3 AGL, an automatic grenade launcher of South African origin
 Heckler & Koch GMG, a 40mm automatic grenade launcher used by the German Army and other European armed forces
 XM174 grenade launcher
 AGS-30, a similar weapon, 30mm calibre
 XM312, a .50 BMG version of the XM307
 Mk 47, a similar but older automatic 40mm grenade launcher, also replacing the Mk 19 in some roles.
 Barrett XM109, an anti-material sniper rifle firing the same ammunition as the XM307 ACSW
 XM25 CDTE,  a 25mm low-velocity smart cannon/grenade launcher for an individual soldier
 XM29 OICW
 Comparison of automatic grenade launchers

References

External links

Discovery Website - XM307 video clip
 M307 Airbursting Weapon System Advanced Crew Served Weapon - Global Security
 XM307 ACSW Advanced Crew-Served Weapon - Modern Firearms
 General Dynamics: Fact Sheet on the XM307

Grenade launchers of the United States
Automatic grenade launchers
Autocannon
Abandoned military projects of the United States